The Nocturne No. 20 in C minor, Op. posth., Lento con gran espressione, P 1, No. 16, KKIVa/16, WN 37, is a solo piano piece composed by Frédéric Chopin in 1830 and published in 1870.

Chopin dedicated this work to his older sister Ludwika Chopin, with the statement: "To my sister Ludwika as an exercise before beginning the study of my second Concerto". First published 21 years after the composer's death, the piece is usually referred to as Lento con gran espressione, from its tempo marking. It is sometimes also called Reminiscence. The piece was played by Holocaust survivor Natalia Karp for the Nazi concentration camp commandant Amon Goeth, with Goeth being so impressed with the rendition that he spared Karp's life.

This was also the piece played by Holocaust survivor and famed Polish pianist Władysław Szpilman (the central figure of the 2002 Roman Polanski film The Pianist) during the last live broadcast of Polish radio on September 23, 1939 when Warsaw was besieged by the German army. Years later Szpilman also played this piece for German army officer Wilm Hosenfeld upon their first meeting, though in the corresponding film scene Szpilman plays an abridged version of Chopin's Ballade No. 1 in G minor, Op. 23. Hosenfeld later helped Szpilman hide and provided food to him in the last months of the war.

Musical structure

The piece is marked Lento con gran espressione and is written in common time. After a quiet introduction, the main theme starts at bar 5, with the left hand playing broken chords in legato slurs throughout the section, imparting a haunting and continuous quality to the music. The theme then shifts to a dreamy pianissimo in bar 21, before returning to the original theme in bar 47, and finally ending in C major. The first two bars of the theme from the middle section (bars 21 and 22), resemble the main theme from the third movement of Chopin's second piano concerto in F minor, which was composed around the same time (1829). The next two bars (bars 23 and 24) resemble the second part of the secondary theme of the first movement from his second piano concerto. The passage in the middle section of the nocturne in  time starting in bar 33 resembles the scherzando section of the third movement of the second piano concerto starting in bar 145 in which the left and right hand are playing an octave apart. In bars 58 through 61, there are 4 different tuplets; an 18-tuplet, a 35-tuplet, an 11-tuplet, and a 13-tuplet, all of which run through the E major scale.

References

External links
 

Posth
1830 compositions
Compositions in C-sharp minor
Compositions by Frédéric Chopin published posthumously
Music dedicated to family or friends